A Pujungan Inscription, also called Bronze Tongtong Inscription, is a short inscription written on a copper slit drum (Bali: tongtong, kulkul), which was found in the village of Pujungan in Pupuan District, Tabanan Regency, Bali, Indonesia. This inscription is thought to have been written during the reign of King Anak Wungsu in the 11th century. This is the first inscription that mentions the name Sasak, the name of the indigenous people of Lombok island.

Philologist J.G. de Casparis examined the inscription, which read:
Sasakdhana prihhan srih jayannira

which he interpreted as:
"This object is a gift from (a) Sasak, (for) the commemoration of his victory."

Currently, the inscription is stored in Pujungan Temple.

References 

Inscriptions in Indonesia
11th-century inscriptions
History of Bali
Lombok